The 2015–16 Connecticut Whale season was the first in franchise history and the Premier Hockey Federation's inaugural season.

Offseason
 On July 1, the Whale signed former BU Terriers blueliner and 2015 Clarkson Cup champion Kaleigh Fratkin to a contract, making her the first Canadian to sign an NWHL contract.

Regular season

Standings

Game log

|-  style="background:#cfc;"
| 1 || October 11 || New York Riveters || 4–1 || || Leonoff || Chelsea Piers CT || 1–0–0 || 2 || 
|-  style="background:#cfc;"
| 2 || October 18 || @ Buffalo Beauts || 5–2 || || Laden || HarborCenter || 2–0–0 || 4 || 
|-  style="background:#cfc;"
| 3 || October 25 || @ New York Riveters || 3–1 || || Stock || Aviator Sports and Events Center || 3–0–0 || 6 || 
|-  style="background:#cfc;"
| 4 || November 15 || @ Buffalo Beauts || 3–2 || || Leonoff || HarborCenter || 4–0–0 || 8 || 
|-  style="background:#cfc;"
| 5 || November 22 || @ Buffalo Beauts || 7–6 || SO || Stock || HarborCenter || 5–0–0 || 10 || 
|-  style="background:#cfc;"
| 6 || November 29 || @ Boston Pride || 4–3 || || Leonoff || Bright Hockey Center || 6–0–0 || 12 || 
|-  style="background:#cfc;"
| 7 || December 6 || Buffalo Beauts || 3–2 || SO || Leonoff || Chelsea Piers CT || 7–0–0 || 14 || 
|-  style="background:#cfc;"
| 8 || December 13 || @ New York Riveters || 4–3 || SO || Leonoff || Aviator Sports and Events Center || 8–0–0 || 16 || 
|-  style="background:#fcc;"
| 9 || December 27 || Boston Pride || 1–2 || || Stock || Chelsea Piers CT || 8–1–0 || 16 || 
|-  style="background:#cfc;"
| 10 || January 3 || @ New York Riveters || 6–1 || || Stock || Aviator Sports and Events Center || 9–1–0 || 18 || 
|-  style="background:#cfc;"
| 11 || January 9 || New York Riveters || 4–3 || || Leonoff || Ingalls Rink || 10–1–0 || 20 || 
|-  style="background:#cfc;"
| 12 || January 10 || Buffalo Beauts || 5–3 || || Stock || Chelsea Piers CT || 11–1–0 || 22 || 
|-  style="background:#fcc;"
| 13 || January 17 || @ Boston Pride || 1–4 || || Leonoff || Bright Hockey Center || 11–2–0 || 22 || 
|-  style="background:#fcc;" 
| 14 || January 31 || Boston Pride || 2–5 || || Leonoff || Chelsea Piers CT || 11–3–0 || 22 || 
|-  style="background:#cfc;"
| 15 || February 7 || Buffalo Beauts || 3–2 || OT || Lundberg || Chelsea Piers CT || 12–3–0 || 24 || 
|-  style="background:#fcc;"
| 16 || February 14 || @ Boston Pride || 2–4 || || Stock || Bright Hockey Center || 12–4–0 || 24 || 
|-  style="background:#fcc;"
| 17 || February 21 || Boston Pride || 3–5 || || Leonoff || Chelsea Piers CT || 12–5–0 || 24 || 
|-  style="background:#cfc;"
| 18 || February 28 || New York Riveters || 4–2 || || Lundberg || Chelsea Piers CT || 13–5–0 || 26 || 
|-

|-
|

Playoffs

Game log

|- style="background:#cfc;"
| 1 || March 4 || Buffalo Beauts || 3–0 || || || Chelsea Piers CT || 1–0 || (No gamesheet available)
|- style="background:#fcc;"
| 2 || March 5 || Buffalo Beauts || 1–4 || || || Chelsea Piers CT || 1–1 || (No gamesheet available)
|- style="background:#fcc;"
| 3 || March 6 || Buffalo Beauts || 3–4 || || Stock || Chelsea Piers CT || 1–2 || 
|-

|- 
|

Statistics
Final

Skaters

Goaltenders

†Denotes player spent time with another team before joining the Whale.  Stats reflect time with the Whale only.
‡Denotes player was traded mid-season.  Stats reflect time with the Whale only.

Roster
Updated February 20, 2016

|}

Awards and honors
NWHL Player of the Week
Kelli Stack – October 11, 2015
Shiann Darkangelo – December 15, 2015
Danielle Ward - Jan 10, 2016
Molly Engstrom - Feb 7, 2016
Shenae Lundberg - Feb 28, 2016

NWHL 1st All-Star Game selection
Jordan Brickner (Team Knight)
Shiann Darkangelo (Team Pfalzer)
Kaleigh Fratkin (Team Knight)
Jaimie Leonoff (Team Knight)
Kelli Stack (Team Knight)

Transactions

Trades

Signings

Other

Draft

The following were the Whale’s selections in the 2015 NWHL Draft on June 20, 2015.

References

Games

 
2015–16 NWHL season by team
Connecticut Whale
Connecticut Whale